The following is a list of Elon Phoenix men's basketball head coaches. There have been 19 head coaches of the Phoenix in their 114-season history.

Elon's current head coach is Billy Taylor. He was hired as the Phoenix's head coach in April 2022, replacing Mike Schrage, who resigned after the 2021–22 season to join the staff at Duke.

References

Elon

Elon Phoenix men's basketball coaches